Julie Anne Peters (born January 16, 1952) is an American author of young adult fiction. Peters has published 20 works, mostly novels, geared toward children and adolescents, many of which feature LGBT characters. In addition to the United States, Peters's books have been published in numerous countries, including South Korea, China, Croatia, Germany, France, Italy, Indonesia, Turkey and Brazil. Her 2004 book Luna was the first young-adult novel with a transgender character to be released by a mainstream publisher.

Early life and education
Julie Anne Peters was born in Jamestown, New York, on January 1, 1952. When she was five, her family moved to the suburbs of Denver, Colorado. Her parents divorced when she was in high school. She has three siblings: a brother, John, and two younger sisters, Jeanne and Susan.

Peters received a BA in elementary education from Colorado Women's College in 1974, with a minor in French.  She taught fifth grade for a year, until she and the principal agreed that teaching was not the career for her. Peters then returned to school, earning a BS in computer and management science from the Metropolitan State University of Denver in 1985. During the next ten years, Peters worked as a research analyst, computer programmer, and systems engineer. In 1989, Peters earned an MBA from the University of Colorado Denver with emphasis in information systems.

Careers
Peters first worked as a teacher, teaching fifth grade and working as a special needs education assistant in the Jefferson County School District in Lakewood, Colorado, 1975. Peters then worked as a secretary, research assistant, computer programmer and systems analyst for Tracom Corporation in Denver from 1975 until 1984. Following this, Peters was a computer systems engineer for "Electronic Data Systems" in Denver from 1985 until 1988.

Peters began her writing career with the publication of her first two books, The Stinky Sneakers Contest, illustrated by Cat Bowman Smith, in 1992, and Risky Friends in 1993.

Peters lives with her wife, Sherri Leggett, in Lakewood, Colorado.

Published works

The Stinky Sneakers Contest (1992)
Risky Friends (1993)
B.J.'s Billion Dollar Bet (1995)
How Do You Spell G-E-E-K? (1996)
Revenge of the Snob Squad (1998)
Romance of the Snob Squad (1999)
Love Me, Love My Broccoli (1999)
Define "Normal" (2000)
A Snitch in the Snob Squad (2001)
Keeping You a Secret (2003)
Luna (2004)
Far from Xanadu (2005) – later republished as Pretend You Love Me
Between Mom and Jo (2006)
grl2grl (2007)
Rage: A Love Story (2009)
By The Time You Read This I'll Be Dead (2010)
She Loves You, She Loves You Not... (2011)
grl2grl 2 (2012)
It's Our Prom (So Deal With it) (2012)
Lies My Girlfriend Told Me (2014)

Awards
Peters has won numerous awards including:
KC3 Reading Award, Greater Kansas City Association of School Librarians in 1995 for The Stinky Sneakers Contest
Best Book in Language Arts: K-6 Novels, Society of School Librarians International in 1997 for How Do You Spell GEEK?
Top Hand Award for Young-Adult Fiction, Colorado Authors' League in 1998 for Revenge of the Snob Squad
Best Books for Young Adults selection, Popular Paperbacks for Young Adults selection and Quick Pick for Reluctant Young Adult Readers selection, all American Library Association (ALA) awards, in 2000 for Define "Normal"
Best Books for Young Adults selection and Popular Paperbacks for Young Adults selection, ALA, Books for the Teen Age selection, New York Public Library and Lambda Literary Award finalist in 2003 for Keeping You a Secret
Amelia Bloomer Project Recommended Feminist Books for Youth and Stonewall Honor Book, ALA, in 2004 for Keeping You a Secret
Buxtehuder Bulle nomination, National Book Award in Young People's Literature finalist in 2004 for Luna
Best Books for Young Adults selection, ALA, Books for the Teen Age selection, New York Public Library, Stonewall Honor Book and Lambda Literary Award finalist in 2005 for Luna
Rainbow REads selection, ALA, in 2005 for Far from Xanadu
Best Books for Young Adults selection and Quick Pick for Reluctant Young-Adult Readers selection, ALA, and Books for the Teen Age selection, New York Public Library in 2006 for Far from Xanadu
Lamda Literary Award, James Cook Teen Book Award, Ohio Library Council, Cybils Award finalist and Rainbow Reads selection in 2006 for Between Mom and Jo
Golden Crown Literary Award finalist and Rainbow Reads selection in 2007 for grl2grl
Books for the Teen Age selection, New York Public Library and Cooperative Children's Books Center Choice designation in 2008 for grl2grl

References

External links

1952 births
American children's writers
Lambda Literary Award winners
American lesbian writers
LGBT people from New York (state)
Living people
People from Jamestown, New York
Systems engineers
University of Colorado Denver alumni
American women children's writers
21st-century American women writers